Steve Hall (born March 19, 1960) is a former Canadian football player who played for the Winnipeg Blue Bombers, Toronto Argonauts, and Ottawa Rough Riders. He previously played at the University of Guelph. After his football career ended, Hall took up bobsledding, competing internationally for Canada's national team for several years.

He is the father of the first overall pick in the 2010 NHL Draft NHL player Taylor Hall 
, who currently plays for the Boston Bruins.

Steve was a bobsled stuntman in the movie Cool Runnings.

He is currently a member of the RJB Fury Fastpitch team in Kingston, Ontario.

References

1960 births
Living people
Canadian football defensive backs
Canadian football wide receivers
Guelph Gryphons football players
Edmonton Elks players
Winnipeg Blue Bombers players
Toronto Argonauts players
Ottawa Rough Riders players